The 2009 edition of the Carrera Panamericana Mexican sports car racing event started in Huatulco, Oaxaca and finished in Nuevo Laredo, Tamaulipas. This edition was composed by 7 stages. The Swedish Stig Blomqvist won this edition. Ana Goni was his co-driver.

Results

Overall

By Category

Stages

Carrera Panamericana
Carrera Panamericana
2009 in Mexican motorsport